Philpott or Philpotts may refer to:

People
 A. L. Philpott (1919–1991), American politician
 A. R. Philpott (died 1978), puppeteer
 Alan Philpott (1942–2009), English footballer
 Albert Philpott (1873–1950), Australian cricketer
 Alfred Philpott (1870–1930), New Zealand milk factory worker, museum curator, entomologist and writer
 Andrew Philpott (born 1990), Australian field hockey player
 Dana Philpott, professor of immunology
 Carl Philpott (born 1975), British olfactologist and rhinologist
 Dave Philpotts (born 1954), football defender from England
 Dean Philpott (born 1935), American football player
 Delbert Philpott (1923–2005), American soldier and scientist
 Ed Philpott (born 1945), American football linebacker
 Elliot Page (born Philpotts-Page; 1987), Canadian actor
 Elmore Philpott (1896–1964), Canadian politician and journalist
 Eric Philpott (1946–2015), Irish Gaelic footballer
 Ernest Philpott (1864–1935)
 Harry M. Philpott (1917–2008), president of Auburn University
 Harvey Cloyd Philpott (1909–1961), American politician
 Henry Philpott (cricketer) (1829–1880), English cricketer
 Jane Philpott (born 1960), Canadian physician and politician
 Lachlan Philpott (born 1972), Australian theatre writer, director, and teacher
 Lee Philpott (born 1970), English footballer
 Madge Bellamy (birth name Margaret Derden Philpott; 1899–1990), American movie actress
 Mick Philpott (born 1956), English criminal convicted for multiple manslaughter
 Nicholas Philpott (1690s–1732)
 Paddy Philpott (1936–2016), Irish hurler
 Peter Philpott (1934–2021), Australian cricketer
 Richard Philpott (1813–1888)
 Shayne Philpott (born 1965), New Zealand rugby union player
 Stacy Philpott, American ecologist
 Toby Philpott (born 1946), English puppeteer, son of A. R. Philpott
 Violet Philpott (1922–2012), English puppeteer and author
 Wade Edward Philpott (1918–1985), American mathematician and puzzle maker
 William Philpott (1819–1891), Australian cricketer

Places
 Philpott, Queensland, a locality in the North Burnett Region, Queensland, Australia
 Philpott, Virginia, an unincorporated community
 Philpott Dam, a dam in the United States
 Philpott Lake, the reservoir created by Philpott Dam

See also
 Phillpott, surname
 Phillpotts, surname
 Philpot (disambiguation)
 Philpots Island